Method acting is sometimes employed by certain actors to evoke realistic emotions into their performance by drawing on personal experiences. Raymond Hamden, a clinical and forensic psychologist, defines the purpose of method acting as "compartmentalizing their own feelings while playing another character [so] they could bring the emotions of that personal feeling to cry if they needed to with that character."

However, when these emotions are not compartmentalized, they can encroach on other facets of life, often seeming to disrupt the actor's psyche. This occurs as the actor delves into previous emotional experiences, be they joyful or traumatic. The psychological effects, like emotional fatigue, comes when suppressed or unresolved raw emotions are unburied to add to the character, not just from the employing personal emotions in performance. The question becomes whether the actor calls up resolved or unresolved emotions in their acting.

Psychological effects 

The psychological effects of method acting vary in intensity from individual to individual. Some common effects include:
Fatigue
Fear
Anxiety
Shame
Irritability
Sleep deprivation
Personality changes
Psychotic disorders

Fatigue, or emotional fatigue, comes mainly when actors "create dissonance between their actions and their actual feelings". A mode of acting referred to as "surface acting" involves only changing one's actions without altering the deeper thought processes. Method acting, when employed correctly, is mainly deep acting, or changing thoughts as well as actions, proven to generally avoid excessive fatigue. Surface acting is statistically "positively associated with a negative mood and this explains some of the association of surface acting with increased emotional exhaustion." This negative mood that is created leads to fear, anxiety, feelings of shame and sleep deprivation.

Raw emotion or unresolved emotions conjured up for acting may result in a sleep deprivation, anger, depression, anxiety and the cyclical nature of the ensuing side effects. Sleep deprivation alone can lead to impaired function, causing some individuals to "acute episodes of psychosis". Sleep deprivation initiates chemical changes in the brain that can lead to behavior similar to psychotic individuals. These episodes can lead to more lasting psychological damage. In cases where raw emotion that has not been resolved, or traumas have been evoked before closure has been reached by the individual, the emotion can result in greater emotional instability and increased sense of anxiety, sadness, fear or shame.

The main psychological problems seen in method acting come from two facets of the emotional acting technique. The most well-known issue stems from the inability of actors to compartmentalize the emotions of the character from their own in daily life. Actors can sometimes have difficulty separating their role from reality when they dive deeply into the psyche of their character. The second problem seen in method acting occurs by way of the technique itself. Actors are tasked with reflecting upon personal emotional events from their past in order to establish the emotional response required by the specific scene in question. When these intense emotions are elicited by recollecting personal experiences of pain, anger, fear, or love, etc, but there is no therapist or counselor to help the individual process, compartmentalize and ultimately heal from those personal experiences, actors can experience a number negative reactions, including generalized anxiety, situational anxiety/fear, depression, episodic anger and post-traumatic stress disorder, among others. 

Generally, the actors who suffer personality changes and psychotic disorders as a result of their difficulty separating role from reality already have some psychotic tendencies or are emotionally unstable. Those who have dissociative identity disorder "can't recognize that the role isn't theirs" and, even though these individuals appear normal, they have psychotic disorders that sometimes take months to identify.   Dissociative identity disorder is a chemically based disorder that results from "high stress and trauma." What these individuals experience psychologically can further detriment their chemical and physiological makeup.

One factor that is rarely discussed when observing the emotional effects of method acting is that the individuals who practice method acting may already be emotionally unstable. Hamden notes that "many actors have had a traumatic life, [and] acting gives [them] the opportunity to be someone else." These individuals are already emotionally unstable and so the effects of method acting are more severe for them. It is only a minority of people, about 32%, that will have extreme traumatic experiences.

Management 
In the professional acting field, most companies have a psychoanalyst that consults on films to give analysis and characteristics for characters. Their responsibility lies in aiding actors in understanding how the character would act. These professionals help when actors cannot relate. Their responsibility is to draw connections and pull raw emotions from the actor to connect with the character.  

Under professional supervision, method acting proves safe and effective. Many actors find the practice of method acting cathartic, similar to psychiatrist Jacob L. Moreno's psychodrama. In this technique, a professional aids in keeping the individual in alignment while they achieve closure for traumatic emotional damage. The harmful situations in method acting arise when there is no professional supervising the process, such as in "cult-like" weekend courses provided by unqualified individuals that cannot monitor the individuals and keep them in alignment psychologically.  

This would be evident in weekend courses where the instructor promises to instruct method acting to a large public class. The instructor would then be incapable of meeting the psychological needs of each individual in the class after their scene has ended, before the next can begin. Harmful psychological effects arise "when control of necessary skill falls short, [and] the balance [shifts] to the negative." This occurs "because the [psychological] risks are in fact greater than anticipated, or because unanticipated obstacles or hurdles arise." The acting situation then becomes threatening and results in the unpleasant feelings of fear, anxiety or shame.

Correlation between acting and physiology 
It is commonly believed that there is a strong correlation between acting and the physiological reaction to acting. According to the task-emotion theory, "the positive emotions of the actor should be coupled with a specific physiological activation. In particular, excited physical reactions were expected to co-exist with task-emotions such as tension, excitement, and challenge." The emotion-task theory proposes that "the 'action tendencies' in characters occupy a special place and differ somewhat from [the] impulses in general behavior." However, studies have been done that show that the correlation between emotions and physical reactions are moderately weak.

The danger comes when control precedence "manifests itself by sudden interruptions of behavior, changes in behavior or by persistence of [character's] behavior." "Control precedence" by emotions is the "feelings, thoughts, impulses, actions or activation going along with aroused emotion that takes precedence over other planned or half executed thoughts, feelings, impulses, etc." Control precedence is the main concern for method acting. It proves a challenge for actors to come out of character after employing method acting techniques, sometimes altering their behavior, urging them to follow impulses that would be foreign to their own personal nature. This difficulty of returning to one's own behavior is the common concern linked with method acting.

Notes

References 

Drama
Acting techniques
Psychological effects
Cause (medicine)